The Lavender Hill Mob is a play based on the 1951 Ealing comedy film with a screenplay by T. E. B. Clarke, adapted for the stage by Phil Porter.

Production history 
The play will make its world premiere at the Everyman Theatre, Cheltenham on 13 October 2022 before touring the UK. The production will be directed by Jeremy Sams and will star Miles Jupp as Henry Holland and Justin Edwards as Alfred Pendlebury.

Cast and characters

External links 

 Official website

References 

2022 plays
Plays based on films
British plays
Comedy plays